Rahsaan Smith (born August 11, 1973) is an American professional basketball player. He is 2.08m (6'10") in height and he weighs 106 kg (235 pounds). He plays the Center position. His last team was Galgos de Tijuana of the Mexican League.

College career
After spending two years at Merritt College, Smith moved to Fresno State University in 1994 and stayed there three years.

Professional career
Besides playing professional basketball in Mexico, Smith has played in Germany (Bayer Leverkusen), the United States (Yakima Sun Kings, Southern California Surf), Argentina (CS Independiente de General Pico, Quilmes Mar del Plata), Saudi Arabia (Al-Ittihad) and Poland (Brok Czarni Slupsk).

Accomplishments
Besides winning the CBA title in 2000, Smith was named MVP of the Saudi Arabian league in 2001.

References

1973 births
Living people
African-American basketball players
American expatriate basketball people in Argentina
American expatriate basketball people in Germany
American expatriate basketball people in Mexico
American expatriate basketball people in Poland
American expatriate basketball people in Saudi Arabia
American men's basketball players
Bayer Giants Leverkusen players
Centers (basketball)
Czarni Słupsk players
Fresno State Bulldogs men's basketball players
Galgos de Tijuana (basketball) players
Junior college men's basketball players in the United States
Lechugueros de León players
Quilmes de Mar del Plata basketball players
21st-century African-American sportspeople
20th-century African-American sportspeople